Hunan University of Arts and Science (HUAS) is a multidisciplinary university in the city of Changde, Hunan, China.

References

External links
 Official website 
 Official website 

Universities and colleges in Hunan
Changde
Educational institutions established in 1898
1898 establishments in China